Molecular Brain is a peer-reviewed open access scientific journal covering research on all aspects of the nervous system at the molecular, cellular and systems levels. The journal was established in 2008 and is published by BioMed Central. The founding editor is Min Zhuo (University of Toronto) and the editors-in-chief are Bong-Kiun Kaang (Seoul National University), and Tim Bliss (National Institute for Medical Research) and Tsuyoshi Miyakawa (Fujita Health University).

Abstracting and indexing 
The journal is abstracted and indexed in:

According to the Journal Citation Reports, the journal has a 2014 impact factor of 4.902.

References

External links 
 

Neuroscience journals
BioMed Central academic journals
Publications established in 2008
English-language journals
Open access journals